Phillips Creek (also known as Philips Creek) is a tributary of Huntington Creek in Luzerne County, Pennsylvania, in the United States. The creek is considered by the Pennsylvania Fish and Boat Commission to be Class A Wild Trout Waters for brook trout throughout its entire length. Glacial till, alluvium, sandstone, and shale can be found in its vicinity. Its course has been altered by glaciation and it is in the vicinity of North Mountain. At least one bridge has been built over the creek and a number of hunting cabins and cottages existed in the area. The creek's discharge has a 10 percent chance of reaching 915 cubic feet per second in any given year.

Course
Phillips Creek begins in a deep valley near North Mountain in Fairmount Township. It flows south for nearly a mile before passing through a pond and receiving two unnamed tributaries, one from the left and one from the right. The creek then flows south-southeast for a considerable distance before leaving the valley and crossing Pennsylvania Route 118. It then turns southwest and then west, entering another valley between Jackson Hill and Bethel Hill. The creek flows south-southwest and then south-southeast for approximately two miles (three kilometers). It then leaves the valley and reaches its confluence with Huntington Creek.

Tributaries
Phillips Creek has no officially named tributaries. However, it does have several unnamed tributaries.

Hydrology
The concentration of alkalinity in the waters of Phillips Creek is 6 milligrams per liter.

At the mouth of Phillips Creek, its discharge has a 10 percent chance of reaching 915 cubic feet per second in any given year. It has a 2 percent chance of reaching 1630 cubic feet per second and a 1 percent chance of reaching 2015 cubic feet per second. The creek has a 0.2 percent chance of reaching a top discharge of 3177 cubic feet per second in any given year.

Geography and geology

The headwaters of Phillips Creek are in North Mountain. The creek has an obstruction in its lower reaches, near Huntington Road. The Gauckler–Manning coefficient value of the creek is 0.045 for its channel and ranges from 0.070 to 0.100 for its overbank.

Phillips Creek attempted to flow down the valley of Lick Branch prior to the glaciation of the area. However, a mass of till under Pennsylvania Route 118 diverted it over a saddle to the west, causing it to end up in its present course. There is a series of waterfalls at the point where the creek is cutting through the saddle. A portion of the creek is located in a deep and narrow gorge. Shortly after they were created, the gorge and the waterfalls were deepened by Lake Bowman, a nearby glacial lake. Downstream of the saddle, the creek is an "overfit stream", meaning that it is too wide for its valley. For this reason, the gorge is gradually widening. A deep col is located between the creek and the valley of Bowman Creek.

In its lower reaches, Phillips Creek is surrounded by bedrock made of interbedded reddish-gray shale and sandstone. Some areas near the creek are on Wisconsinan Till. Wisconsinan Ice-Contact Stratified Drift and alluvium are also found along parts of the stream, especially in its middle and upper reaches. Additionally, an alluvial fan is present in the creek's upper reaches.

Watershed
The creek is entirely within the United States Geological Survey quadrangle of Sweet Valley.

Phillips Creek is one of the main sources of flooding in Fairmount Township, along with Kitchen Creek. The creek flooded in 1972 and 1975. A number of hunting cabins and cottages existed in the watershed in the 1970s. At the time, these were the only disturbances to the forests on North Mountain There is a small lake in the upper reaches of the creek.

History
Phillips Creek was entered into the Geographic Names Information System on August 2, 1979. Its identifier in the Geographic Names Information System is 1183672.

A prestressed box beam bridge was constructed over Phillips Creek in 1993. In 1991, plans were made to replace a bridge carrying the road T-620 over the creek for a cost of $277,000.

Biology
A section of Phillips Creek is considered by the Pennsylvania Fish and Boat Commission to be Class A Wild Trout Waters for brook trout. The section of the creek that stretches from Pennsylvania Route 118 to its mouth is also considered to be Class A Wild Trout Waters, but for both brook trout and brown trout. The creek is one of six direct tributaries of Huntington Creek to be designated as Class A Wild Trout Waters. The others are Mitchler Run, Shingle Run, Arnold Creek, Lick Branch, and part of Kitchen Creek. However, Phillips Creek was stocked in 1933–1934.

In the early 1900s, mammals such as bobcats and bears were observed in the vicinity of Phillips Creek.

See also
Kitchen Creek (Pennsylvania), next tributary of Huntington Creek going downstream
Lick Branch, next tributary of Huntington Creek going upstream
List of tributaries of Fishing Creek (North Branch Susquehanna River)

References

Rivers of Luzerne County, Pennsylvania
Tributaries of Fishing Creek (North Branch Susquehanna River)
Rivers of Pennsylvania